Gunaore is a village in Parner taluka in Ahmednagar district of the state of Maharashtra, India.

Religion
The majority of the population in the village is Hindu. There are several temples in the village. Every year, there is festival in the name of the village deity Bhairavanath.

Education
ZP's Primary School up to 4th standard.

Economy
The majority of the population has farming as their primary occupation. This village is known for its modern adopted technique of agriculture. Pomegranates, sugar cane, onions and water melons are main crops.

See also
 Villages in Parner taluka

References 

Villages in Parner taluka
Villages in Ahmednagar district